Scholae is a Latin word, literally meaning "schools" (from the singular schola, school or group) that was used in the late Roman Empire to signify a unit of Imperial Guards. The unit survived in the Byzantine Empire until the 12th century. Michel Rouche succinctly traced the word's development, especially in the West: "The term schola, which once referred to the imperial guard, came to be applied in turn to a train of warrior-servants who waited on the king, to the group of clergymen who waited on the bishop, to the monks of a monastery, and ultimately to a choral society; it did not mean 'school' before the ninth century."

The imperial Scholae

While the singular schola still was used to refer to learning of singing and a mode of writing, the plural had an independent meaning. Next to the old kind of school, the Scholae Palatinae, established by Constantine the Great as a replacement to the Praetorian Guard, was the training center of the imperial palace guard. It remained based at Constantinople, eventually declining to a purely ceremonial role. However, in the 8th century, the Scholae were reformed into one of the elite cataphract Tagmata regiments, and continued to serve until the reign of Alexios I Komnenos.

Ecclesiastical scholae 
In Christianity, a choralschola is a church choir that sings plainsong. Also, the guilds of notarii (notaries) called themselves one schola, or different scholae. In the 4th century, Pope Sylvester I (died 335) was said to have founded the schola cantorum, reformed by Pope Gregory (died 604), but there was an oral tradition until the written proof for the foundation of this schola from the 8th century.

Ancient Greek "Σχολαί" 
Plural of the Ancient Greek word "σχολή" (from which its Latin counterpart "Scholae" derives), meaning: 'rest, leisure' (Pi., lA), '(learned) conversation, lecture' (PI., Arist.), 'place of lecture, auditorium, school' (Arist.).

See also 
 Praetorian Guard
 Imperial guard
 Schola cantorum (papal choir)
 Schola Medica Salernitana

Not related to scholae:
Non scholae, sed vitae discimus

Notes

Sources 
V. H. Galbraith, An Introduction to the Use of the Public Records (1934)
V. H. Galbraith, Studies in the Public Records (1948)

Roman Empire in late antiquity